Supermilk is an indie rock band from London, England. Originally the solo recording project of former Doe drummer/vocalist Jake Popyura, Supermilk has been releasing music since 2017 with a full band incarnation active since 2020.

History
Supermilk released its first EP Hello? Yes this is Supermilk... in 2017 via Keroleen Records. A second EP, Rare Delusions, followed in 2019.

After the dissolution of Popyura's long term band Doe, Supermilk announced the release of its debut album along with a live band featuring members of Personal Best, Colour Me Wednesday and Cheerbleederz.  Several shows were scheduled but later cancelled due to the global coronavirus pandemic. The album, Death Is the Best Thing for You Now, was released on March 27th 2020.

Unable to perform live due to the UK's COVID-19 restrictions, Popyura spent much of 2020 writing the project's second full-length album. Recorded in December the same year with producer Rich Mandell of Happy Accidents, Four by Three was released via Specialist Subject Records on July 2nd 2021. The album was placed at number 2 in Good Morning America's 50 Best Albums of 2021.

Supermilk finally began performing live in 2022 and in April embarked on a UK tour with Nervus. A live album, Live from Rad Apples, is due for release on July 15th 2022 via Specialist Subject Records.

Members
Current members
Jake Popyura – vocals, bass, guitars, drums, synthesiser (2017–present)
Sophie MacKenzie – guitars, vocals (2020–present)
Em Foster – guitars, vocals (2021–present)
Jason Cavalier – drums (2020–present)

Former members
Dean Smithers – guitars, vocals (2020)
Laura Ankles – bass (2020)

Discography

Albums
Death Is the Best Thing for You Now, LP (2020) Keroleen Records
Four by Three, LP/VHS (2021) Specialist Subject Records

Live albums
Live from Rad Apples, cassette (2022) Specialist Subject Records

EPs
Hello? Yes this is Supermilk..., Mini CD (2017) Keroleen Records
Rare Delusions, cassette (2019) Keroleen Records

Singles
Sense, digital (2021) Specialist Subject Records

References

External links
Official website

Underground punk scene in the United Kingdom
Musical groups from London
Musical groups established in 2017
British indie rock groups
British punk rock groups
Specialist Subject Records artists
2017 establishments in England